The New Jersey Americans were an American soccer club based in New Brunswick, New Jersey that was a member of the American Soccer League. The amateur team won the ASL championship in 1977, in its second year of existence.

After the 1979 season, the club moved to Miami, Florida and became known as the Miami Americans.

Year-by-year

Coaches
 Rich Melvin: 1976
 Manny Schellscheidt: 1977-1978
 Arthur Stewart: 1979
 Tom O'Dea: 1979
 Eddie Firmani: 1979

Notable players
 Juan Cano (1977–??)
  Ringo Cantillo (1977) 22 Apps 7 Goals
 Eusébio (1978)
 Woody Hartmann (1976)
 Kevin Kiernan (1976) 21 Apps 6 Goals
 Jose Neto (1977–78) 39 Apps 34 Goals
  Telmo Pires (1977)
 Steve Reid (1978) 21 Apps 8 Goals 
 John Roeslein (1976–77) 20 Apps 7 Goals
 Skip Roderick (1976–78) 53 Apps 1 Goal
 Antonio Simoes (1978)
 Jerry Sularz (1977–78)
 Carlos Velasquez (1977–78)

Honors
ASL Season MVP
 1977 Ringo Cantillo

ASL Rookie of the Year
 1976: John Roeslein

ASL Leading Goal Scorer''
 1977 Jose Neto (17 Goals)ASL Leading Point Scorer 1977 Jose Neto (36 Points)ASL All-Star Team'''
1977 Telmo Pires, Ringo Cantillo, Juan Cano, Jose Neto

References

 
Defunct soccer clubs in New Jersey
American Soccer League (1933–1983) teams
1976 establishments in New Jersey
1979 disestablishments in New Jersey
Association football clubs established in 1976
Association football clubs disestablished in 1979